A. elegantissima may refer to:
 Alvania elegantissima, a sea snail species
 Anthopleura elegantissima, the aggregating anemone or clonal anemone, a sea anemone species found along the shores of the Pacific coast of North America
 Asperdaphne elegantissima, a sea snail species

Synonyms
 Anaxita elegantissima, a synonym for Anaxita decorata, the decorated beauty, a moth species found in Mexico and Central America